V1494 Aquilae or Nova Aquilae 1999 b was a nova which occurred during 1999 in the constellation Aquila and reached a brightness of magnitude 3.9 on 2 December 1999. making it easily visible to the naked eye.  The nova was discovered with 14×100 binoculars by Alfredo Pereira of Cabo da Roca, Portugal at 18:50 UT on 1 December 1999, when it had a visual magnitude of 6.0.

V1494 Aquilae is classified as a fast nova, meaning it faded from peak brightness by more than 3 magnitudes in less than 100 days.  During its decline, V1494 Aql produced unusual variations in its x-ray radiation, including a bright burst lasting several minutes.  During 2000, the x-ray spectrum developed from a hard (high energy) emission-line spectrum to a spectrum typical of a super soft X-ray source.  The x-ray intensity varied with a period of about 40 minutes, probably due to pulsations induced in the white dwarf by its re-kindled hydrogen fusion.

All novae are binary systems with two stars orbiting so close to each other that one star, the "donor" star transfers matter to the other star which is a white dwarf. The stars' orbital period is 3.23 hours, and the system is an eclipsing binary with two brightness minima each orbit, one 0.5 and one 0.1 magnitudes deep. This apparently is a measurement of two stars of approximately equal brightness, the nova and a companion  to the south east. Measuring only the brightness of the nova, the eclipses are about two magnitudes deep. The white dwarf is probably an oxygen-neon-magnesium type.

Unlike some novae, the material ejected from V1494 Aquilae has not formed a visible nebula around the star.

The distance to V1494 Aquilae has been estimated by different methods.

References

External links
 www.tsm.toyama.toyama.jp
 Simbad
 Image V1494 Aquilae
 V1494 Aql International Variable Star Index
 V1494 Aql AAVSO comparison chart

Astronomical X-ray sources
Novae
Aquila (constellation)
1999 in science
Aquilae, V1494